Angus B. Rothwell was Superintendent of Public Instruction of Wisconsin.

Biography
Rothwell was born on July 25, 1905, in Superior, Wisconsin. He graduated from the University of Wisconsin-Superior and Columbia University. Additionally, he received honorary degrees from Carroll University and Lawrence University. During World War II, he served in the United States Navy. He also served as President of Rotary International. Rothwell died on August 11, 1981.

Educational career
Rothwell was an elementary school principal in Wausau, Wisconsin, and a high school principal in Superior. He later served as Superintendent of Schools of Superior from 1941 to 1949 and of Manitowoc, Wisconsin, from 1949 to 1961. Rothwell was elected Superintendent of Public Instruction in 1961 and re-elected in 1965. He was also a member of the Board of Regents of the University of Wisconsin-Madison.

References

Politicians from Superior, Wisconsin
Politicians from Wausau, Wisconsin
People from Manitowoc, Wisconsin
Superintendents of Public Instruction of Wisconsin
Educators from Wisconsin
Military personnel from Wisconsin
United States Navy sailors
United States Navy personnel of World War II
Rotary International leaders
University of Wisconsin–Superior alumni
Columbia University alumni
1905 births
1981 deaths
20th-century American politicians